Hatunsaray is a small village in Meram, Konya Province, Turkey located south-southeast of the ancient site of Lystra. A small museum within the village of Hatunsaray displays artifacts from ancient Lystra.

References

Villages in Konya Province
Lycaonia